Jennifer Dowdell, writing under the pseudonym Nikki Baker (born 1962), is an American mystery novelist. Her character Virginia Kelly is the first African-American detective to appear in lesbian fiction.

Biography
Dowdell, who is herself African-American, received her bachelor's degree in chemical engineering and took an MBA in economics and finance, and worked briefly as an engineer before turning to the financial services industry. Her mystery novels feature a young, black, lesbian financial analyst who lives and works in Chicago. She has also written two anthologized novellas. Baker's work has been published by such outlets as Naiad Press, Bella Books, and Third Side Press.

Little biographical information about Dowdell is available, and she remains private about her life. Two of her novels, The Lavender House Murder and Long Goodbyes, were finalists for the Lambda Literary Award for Lesbian Mystery.

Works
(List from:)

Novels
 In the Game, 1991
 The Lavender House Murder, 1992
 Long Goodbyes, 1993
 The Ultimate Exit Strategy: A Virginia Kelly Mystery, 2001

Novellas
 "Film Noir", 1995
 "Negatives", 1996

References

1962 births
Living people
American mystery writers
Women mystery writers
African-American novelists
American women novelists
20th-century American novelists
20th-century American women writers
Pseudonymous women writers
20th-century pseudonymous writers
20th-century African-American women writers
20th-century African-American writers
21st-century African-American people
21st-century African-American women